A special relationship is a diplomatic relationship that is especially strong and important. This term is usually used to refer to the relationship between the United States and the United Kingdom. In an extended use of the term, it has also been used to describe the whole of EU–US relations and the following relations:

See also 
 A History of the English-Speaking Peoples
 Atlanticism
 North Atlantic triangle

References 

International relations terminology
Diplomacy

he:היחסים המיוחדים
no:Det spesielle forholdet